Decades: World Tour (also referred to as Decades: World Tour 2018) was the seventh world tour by Finnish symphonic metal band Nightwish, in support of their seventh compilation album, Decades.

The band included a special setlist for this tour, featuring rare songs from the earlier era to revisit with some new twists. The setlist was a 'one-off' and only performed on this tour. It is the final tour to feature longtime bassist/vocalist Marko Hietala who later departed from the band in January 2021.

The Buenos Aires show was recorded for their sixth live DVD known as Decades: Live in Buenos Aires which was released on December 6, 2019.

Reception

Jean-Frederic Vachon of Canadian website Diary of a Music Addict who attended the Montreal performance, praised Jansen's vocals which he said were powerful. He also praised the inclusion of the band's older material that hadn't been played for more than a decade, that it sounded much better than it did on the albums, and that the selection "did a great job covering Nightwish's entire career" and awarded the hardcore fans of Nightwish. Vachon also praised the newer songs, citing that they had gained an energy that lifted the band even higher.

Jovan Ristić of Hardwired Magazine, attending the Budapest show, praised the choice of including Beast in Black as the opening band in support for the band. Ristić noted on Jansen's vocals, citing them as "spectacularly versatile, easily moving between semi-growling, mellow and operatic vocals". He praised the powerful visual experience on the stage, as well as the pyro and confetti, which he cited "made the show firmly engraved in the minds of the audience". Ristić concluded his review by stating his confidence on what the future will hold for Nightwish, in which he said "it will be a bright one".

Katie Frost of AntiHero Magazine who was in attendance of the London performance, gave the performance a positive review, reflecting on the concert as "glorious and breathtaking" and that she was captivated. She noted the raised platforms, visual effects and the delighted crowds in attendance. She praised Jansen's vocals, citing them as "incredible".

Setlist

Sample Setlist
The following setlist was performed at the Paramount Theatre in Denver, and is not intended to represent all of the shows on tour.
"End of All Hope"
"Wish I Had an Angel"
"10th Man Down"
"Come Cover Me"
"Gethsemane"
"Élan"
"Sacrament of Wilderness"
"Dead Boy's Poem"
"Elvenjig" (live premiere)
"Elvenpath"
"I Want My Tears Back"
"The Carpenter"
"The Kinslayer"
"Devil & the Deep Dark Ocean"
"Nemo"
"Slaying the Dreamer"
"The Greatest Show on Earth (Chapters I, II and III)"
"Ghost Love Score"

Tour dates

Personnel

 Floor Jansen – female vocals
 Tuomas Holopainen – keyboards
 Emppu Vuorinen – guitars
 Kai Hahto – drums
 Marko Hietala – bass, male vocals
 Troy Donockley – Uilleann pipes, tin whistle, bouzouki, additional vocals, additional guitars

Guest musicians
 Tapio Wilska – male vocals (performed "10th Man Down" and "Devil & the Deep Dark Ocean" at Ilosaarirock and Mukkula – July 13 and 21, 2018)
 Netta Skog – accordion (performed "Wishmaster" at Mukkula, Gatorade Center and Hartwall Arena –  July 21, December 14 and 15, 2018)

References

External links
Nightwish's official website

Nightwish concert tours
2018 concert tours